Gray's ornate skink (Oligosoma ornatum) is a species of skink found in New Zealand.

References

Oligosoma
Reptiles described in 1843
Reptiles of New Zealand
Endemic fauna of New Zealand
Taxa named by John Edward Gray
Endemic reptiles of New Zealand